The Acer Iconia A500 is a tablet computer designed, developed and marketed by Acer Inc. The A500 launched with the Android Honeycomb operating system which is now upgradable to Ice Cream Sandwich 4.0.3 (since April 2012).  The tablet is also sold in almost identical form as the Packard Bell Liberty Tab G100.

Hardware
This tablet has a 5 MP rear camera and 2 MP front camera for video calling. It is powered by 1 GHz Nvidia Tegra 250 processor and 1024 MB DDR2 RAM. The A500 is sold with 64GB flash in certain countries although both 16GB and 32GB models are available.

The A500 was one of the first Android tablets to feature a full size USB port directly in the tablet, opposed to the ASUS Eee Pad Transformer that provides one only with the accessory keyboard dock. Since the latest version of Android Honeycomb (3.2) The device supports a much larger variety of USB devices including NTFS and linux partitions. Previously, the number of compatible devices was very limited, with only USB mice, keyboard and FAT32 formatted drives (NTFS and other file-systems were available through apps that depend upon rooting) being able to be used with the tablet.

Software
The tablet was offered with Android 3.0 upon release. Android 3.1 and 3.2 was made available later through over the air updates and Android 4.0.3 (Ice Cream Sandwich) update has since been made available (April 2012).

Root was possible using an app developed by sc2k and published at xda-developers. up to Android version 3.1 after which the vulnerability used was patched up by Acer, although by downgrading to one of these susceptible version of Android one can install ClockworkMod Recovery before installing a pre-rooted version of 3.2.1 or indeed Ice Cream Sandwich.

Some leaks of Android 4.0.3 from Acer were published on xda-developers over a series of months leading up to its April 2012 release.

As of now, there are a few ROMs that are built based on the leaks and many of them were updated numerous times to be based on the newer releases as they came through from Acer. Many of these, such as the popular 'Flexreaper' ROM are now based on actual OTA releases.

In April 2012 Acer released Ice Cream Sandwich 4.0.3 which in some regions is identical to the 1.031.00 leak from March
This ICS Release is susceptible to Rooting solutions that date back to the original leaks – all of which utilise the 'mempodroid' exploit by saurik. Although the previous 'itsmagic' trick, also by sc2k, no longer works with the updated bootloader, one can utilise the device's APX Mode to install modified images, provided one is able to obtain their unique UID from the device and hence calculate their Secure Boot Key. As the installation of a patched bootloader permits the loading of any unsigned image, one can root the tablet using a combination of a patched bootloader and ClockworkMod Recovery, thus removing the necessity for a userland exploit.

Developers on the TegraOwners forum have produced community maintained and developed builds of later Android releases, which have not been approved nor endorsed by Acer. These releases include builds based on:
 Android 4.0.4 (Ice Cream Sandwich) based on CyanogenMod 9
 Android 4.1.2 (Jelly Bean) based on CM10
 Android 4.2.1 (Jelly Bean) based on CM10.1
 Android 4.3.1 (Jelly Bean) based on CM10.2
 Android 4.4.4 (KitKat) based on OmniROM 4.4
 Android 5.1.1 (Lollipop) based on OmniROM 5.1 or CM12.1

Ubuntu Linux also was made to work in the Acer Iconia A500 by installing the kernel in place of the recovery image. The root file-system for the Ubuntu installation must be placed in a SD card. Other sources also state that it is possible to run Ubuntu 10.10 by using chroot and VNC for a Linux GUI.

In 2019, Android 10 Go was released. Some YouTubers post videos about how to dual boot a tablet like the Acer Iconia A500. They stated that Android Go is really lightweight and free up a significant amount of space for installing Windows 10.

References

Iconia Tab A500
Tablet computers introduced in 2011
Tablet computers
Android (operating system) devices